Sennoy is a rural locality (a khutor) in Mikhaylovka Urban Okrug, Volgograd Oblast, Russia. The population was 1,022 as of 2010. There are 14 streets.

Geography 
Sennoy is located 40 km northeast of Mikhaylovka. Bolshaya Glushitsa is the nearest rural locality.

References 

Rural localities in Mikhaylovka urban okrug